Colossal Cave may refer to:

 Colossal Cave (Arizona), cave system in Arizona
 Colossal Cavern, cave in Kentucky
 Colossal Cave Adventure, 1976 computer game based on Mammoth Cave National Park in Kentucky
 Colossal Cave (video game), 2023 reimagining of the 1976 video game

See also
 Mammoth Cave (disambiguation)
 Grotta Gigante